International Center or International Centre may refer to:

Buildings
 International Centre, a convention centre in Toronto, Ontario, Canada
 International Center, Dallas, a neighborhood of high-rise buildings in Texas, US
 Honolulu International Center, the former name of the community center Neal S. Blaisdell Center, Hawaii, US
 International Centre, Goa, a conference centre in India

Other uses
 International Center Station, a subway station in Japan

See also
 International Convention Centre (disambiguation)